An electroweak star is a theoretical type of exotic star, whereby the gravitational collapse of the star is prevented by radiation pressure resulting from electroweak burning, that is, the energy released by conversion of quarks to leptons through the electroweak force. This process occurs in a volume at the star's core approximately the size of an apple, containing about two Earth masses and reaching temperatures on the order of 1015 K.

Formation
The stage of life of a star that produces an electroweak star is theorized to occur after a supernova collapse. Electroweak stars are denser than quark stars, and may form when quark degeneracy pressure is no longer able to withstand gravitational attraction, but may still be withstood by electroweak burning radiation pressure. This phase of a star's life may last upwards of 10 million years.

The energy output of an electroweak star is limited by the quark supply rate, which is dictated by gravitational collapse. Each interaction converts nine quarks into three anti-leptons, violating conservation of baryon and lepton number while preserving B−L, generating around 300 GeV per interaction. The energy diffuses out of the star as a mixture of neutrinos and photons. Electroweak stars could be identified through the equal number of neutrinos emitted of all three generations, taking into account neutrino oscillation.

See also
 Electroweak force
 Chiral anomaly
 Sphaleron
 Quark nova
 Quark star
 Preon star
 Lepton
 Quark
 Degenerate matter
 Degeneracy pressure

References

Sources

Further reading

External links
 

Star types
Hypothetical stars